The Colour Identification Guide to Moths of the British Isles (Macrolepidoptera) by Bernard Skinner is a single volume identification guide to the macromoths of Britain and Ireland published by Viking Books, often referred by moth recorders simply as "Skinner". The first edition (black dust jacket) was published in 1984, and a second, revised edition (pale green dust jacket) in 1998. The book became the standard guide to macromoth identification used by moth recorders in the field in Britain, and the increased popularity of moth recording in Britain in the 1990s is often attributed in large part to this book.

The first edition of the guide was illustrated by 42 colour photographic plates of pinned moth specimens, photographed by David Wilson. An extra plate by Wilson, showing additional species or aberrations was included in the second edition. For some species, additional line drawings showing specific identification features are included within the text.

A companion guide to caterpillars, The Colour Identification Guide to Caterpillars of the British Isles, by Jim Porter, was published in 1997.

1984 non-fiction books
Books on Lepidoptera